Lavipharm S.A. was founded in 1911 and is the largest integrated Greek pharmaceutical company that develops, manufactures, markets and distributes pharmaceutical, cosmetic, veterinary and consumer health products in Greece and internationally (France, Cyprus and the United States).

Pharmaceutical companies of Greece
Pharmaceutical companies established in 1911
Greek brands
Health care companies established in 1911
Greek companies established in 1911